That's So Raven is the soundtrack album to the Disney Channel original series of the same name. The album includes songs sung by the show's star, Raven-Symoné and its theme song. The album debuted and peaked at #44 on the Billboard 200 and has been certified Gold by the RIAA for sales of 500,000 copies.

Critical reception 

A mixed review by the ParentCenter Family Entertainment Guide called the album both "fun" and "predictable".

Track listing

Charts

Certifications

Disney Karaoke Series 

The Disney Karaoke Series: That's So Raven is a karaoke album featuring songs from the Disney series That's So Raven.

Track listing 
 "Supernatural"
 "Shine"
 "We Are Family"
 "Ultimate"
 "(There's Gotta Be) More to Life"
 "Jungle Boogie"
 "You Gotta Be"
 "That's So Raven (Theme Song)"
 "Supernatural"
 "Shine" (vocal)
 "We Are Family" (vocal)
 "Ultimate" (vocal)
 "(There's Gotta Be) More to Life" (vocal)
 "Jungle Boogie" (vocal)
 "You Gotta Be" (vocal)
 "That's So Raven (Theme Song)" (vocal)

References 

2004 soundtrack albums
2005 compilation albums
Albums produced by Matthew Gerrard
Albums produced by the Underdogs (production team)
Pop compilation albums
Pop soundtracks
Rhythm and blues soundtracks
Television soundtracks
Walt Disney Records compilation albums
Walt Disney Records soundtracks
Soundtrack